Hukkeri Rural Electric Co-operative Society Ltd is India's first electric co-operative society, established on 21 July 1969 under the provisions of the Karnataka Co-operative Societies Act, 1959. The society also runs a unit which is involved in manufacturing of cement poles (alternative to iron poles) under the name of late prominent co-operative leader in North Karnataka, Appannagouda Patil.

References

Cooperatives in India
Companies based in Karnataka
Electric power companies of India
Indian companies established in 1969
1969 establishments in Mysore State